ERMC may refer to:

Eastern Region Ministry Course
ERMC (cable system)